Dance and Cry is the seventh album by Vancouver-based indie rock band Mother Mother, released on November 2, 2018. It was produced by Ryan Guldemond and Ben Kaplan.

Track listing

Personnel
Molly Guldemond – vocals and keyboard
Ryan Guldemond – guitar and vocals
Jasmin Parkin – keyboard and vocals
Ali Siadat – drums
Mike Young – bass

Charts

References

Mother Mother albums
2018 albums